William Francis Spencer Ponsonby, 1st Baron de Mauley (31 July 1787 – 16 May 1855), was an English Whig politician who sat in the House of Commons between 1826 and 1837. He was raised to the Peerage in 1838.

Life

Ponsonby was the youngest child of 3rd Earl of Bessborough and his wife Henrietta Ponsonby, Countess of Bessborough.

Ponsonby was elected Member of Parliament for Poole in 1826 and held the seat until 1831, when he lost it in a by-election to Lord Ashley. He was then MP for Knaresborough between June and December 1832. At the 1832 UK general election he was elected MP for Dorset and held the seat until 1837. On 10 July 1838 he was created Baron de Mauley, of Canford in the County of Dorset. Whilst an MP for Poole, Ponsonby and Benjamin Lester opened Poole's first public library in 1830.

When the marriage of his sister Lady Caroline to William Lamb, 2nd Viscount Melbourne, began to break up, he strongly supported Caroline. Unfortunately he was not noted for tact or intelligence—Melbourne's sister Emily Lamb, Countess Cowper, described him as being universally regarded as "an ass and a jackanapes". Ponsonby reminded Melbourne that the Lamb family were socially parvenu, and that his sister had married beneath her; although true, these remarks were so tactless that Melbourne broke off any further dealings with him.

Family
On 8 August 1814, Ponsonby married Lady Barbara Ashley-Cooper (the only daughter and heir of the 5th Earl of Shaftesbury and a co-heir of the medieval Barony of Mauley, 1789–1844). They had three children:

 Hon. Charles Frederick Ashley Cooper (1815–1896, later the 2nd Baron de Mauley)
 Hon. Frances Anne Georgiana (1817–1910), married George Kinnaird, 9th Lord Kinnaird.
 Hon. Ashley George John (1831–1898)

References

External links 
 

1787 births
1855 deaths
Ponsonby, William
Whig (British political party) MPs for English constituencies
Ponsonby, William
William Ponsonby, 1st Baron de Mauley
Ponsonby, William
Ponsonby, William
Ponsonby, William
Ponsonby, William
Ponsonby, William
UK MPs who were granted peerages
Fellows of the Royal Society
William 1
Peers of the United Kingdom created by Queen Victoria